Yuraq Apachita (Quechua yuraq white, Aymara apachita the place of transit of an important pass in the principal routes of the Andes; name for a stone cairn in the Andes, a little pile of rocks built along the trail in the high mountains,  Hispanicized spelling Yuracapacheta) is a mountain in the Andes of Peru, about  high. It is situated in the Puno Region, Lampa Province, Pucará District, southwest of Pucará.

References

Mountains of Peru
Mountains of Puno Region